William Robert Ware (May 27, 1832 – June 9, 1915), born in Cambridge, Massachusetts into a family of the Unitarian clergy, was an American architect, author, and founder of two important American architectural schools.

He received his own professional education at Milton Academy, Harvard College and Harvard's Lawrence Scientific School. In 1859, he began working for Richard Morris Hunt, the founder of the first American architectural school, the AIA, and the first American to graduate from the Ecole des Beaux-Arts.  Soon afterward Ware formed a partnership with the civil engineer Edward S. Philbrick, Philbrick and Ware, and they designed the Swedenborgian High Street Church in Brookline, Massachusetts.

In 1864, Ware partnered with fellow Harvard graduate Henry Van Brunt to form Ware & Van Brunt.  Their Boston-area designs include Harvard's Memorial and Weld Halls, the Episcopal Divinity School campus in Cambridge, Massachusetts, the Providence Athenaeum in Providence, Rhode Island, the Walter Hunnewell house (1875) at the Hunnewell estate in Wellesley (then West Needham), and the Ether Monument at the Boston Public Garden.  In 1865, Ware became the first professor of architecture at the Massachusetts Institute of Technology. Architect Joseph Lyman Silsbee apprenticed under Ware and Van Brunt after graduating MIT in 1869.

In 1881 Ware and Van Brunt amicably dissolved their partnership, and Ware moved to New York City to found the School of Architecture at Columbia University, which began as the Architecture Department in the Columbia School of Mines. He retired in 1903 in poor health.

Ware also dabbled briefly in voting systems and used the idea of the single transferable vote to devise what is now called, in the U.S., instant-runoff voting, around 1870, used in several English speaking countries.

Publications

 The American Vignola (1904)
 The Study of Architectural Drawing in the School of Architecture (1896)
 Modern Perspective: A Treatise Upon the Principles and Practice of Plane and Cylindrical Perspective (1882)

References

External links

The Ether Monument at dcMemorials.com
William R. Ware papers at the Massachusetts Institute of Technology

Milton Academy alumni
19th-century American architects
Architects from Boston
Architects from Cambridge, Massachusetts
1832 births
1915 deaths
Columbia University faculty
Harvard School of Engineering and Applied Sciences alumni
MIT School of Architecture and Planning faculty
Writers from Cambridge, Massachusetts
Harvard College alumni